Alyssum minutum is a species of flowering plant in the genus Alyssum, family Brassicaceae, native to the Mediterranean and Eastern Europe.

An annual herbaceous plant, typically reaching a size of 5–10cm, it grows on gravelly soil, rocky slopes and dry grassland. It flowers from March until early summer. Its chromosome number is 2n=16.

Distribution 
The plant is found in scattered locations on the Iberian Peninsula (at elevations of 1000–2000m in the Baetic System and in the central and northwestern parts of the peninsula), Italy (Sardinia, Sicily and Calabria), Greece (throughout the mainland, Crete, Lesbos and some of the larger islands; at elevations of 500–1900m, rarely as low as sea level or as high as 2200m), in southern Albania, North Macedonia, southeastern Serbia, Bulgaria (in the Upper Thracian Plain and the north-east), in eastern Romania, northern Moldova, in Ukraine (especially in the Black Sea Lowland and in Crimea), western and central Turkey, in Cyprus, West Syria, Lebanon, Egypt and Morocco. It was reported as present in the Caucasus by the 1939 Flora of USSR, but this is not mentioned in the other sources cited here.

References 

minutum